Lalith Chandra Buddhisiri Dissanayake (born 19 November 1955) is a Sri Lankan politician, a member of the Parliament of Sri Lanka and a government minister. He is an alumnus of Dharmaraja College.

In October 2000 he was elected Deputy Chairman of Committees, a position he held until October 2001.

References

Alumni of Dharmaraja College
1955 births
Living people
Provincial councillors of Sri Lanka
Members of the 11th Parliament of Sri Lanka
Members of the 13th Parliament of Sri Lanka
Members of the 14th Parliament of Sri Lanka
Government ministers of Sri Lanka
Sri Lanka Freedom Party politicians
United People's Freedom Alliance politicians
Deputy chairmen of committees of the Parliament of Sri Lanka
Sinhalese politicians